The 207 Al-Farooq Corps is one of the eight corps of the Islamic Emirate Army established in October 2021 and headquartered in Herat. The current Chief of Staff is Abdul Razzaq Akhund.

The Islamic Republic of Afghanistan-era corps it replaced was known as the 207th 'Zafar' Corps and was a part of Afghan National Army.

Commands

References

Military units and formations established in 2021
Corps of the Islamic Emirate Army